Wilfred William Dennis Shine (20 October 1911 – 24 July 1997) was a British theatre, film and television actor. Shine was born into a family of theatre actors; among others, Shine's father, mother, grandmother, two uncles and an aunt had worked in theatre. His father Wilfred Shine was a theatre actor who also appeared in films during the 1920s and the 1930s. Bill Shine made his film debut in 1929, since which he appeared in over 160 films and television series. Towards the end of his career, he was best known for playing Inventor Black on children's television series Super Gran. In series two, episode four, of Mrs Thursday, 'The Duke and I', (1967), he played the Duke of Midlothian.

Selected filmography

 The Flying Scotsman (1929) - Barman (uncredited)
 High Seas (1929) - Minor Role (uncredited)
 Under the Greenwood Tree (1929) - Leaf
 The Loves of Robert Burns (1930) - (uncredited)
 Harmony Heaven (1930) - Rejected Actor (uncredited)
 The Last Hour (1930) - Ben
 The Yellow Mask (1930) - Sunshine 
 These Charming People (1931) - Ulysses Wiggins
 Many Waters (1931) - Registry Office Junior Clerk (uncredited)
 The Bells (1931)
 Money for Nothing (1932) - Minor Role (uncredited)
 Verdict of the Sea (1932) - Slim
 The Man from Toronto (1933) - Butcher's Delivery Boy
 Waltzes from Vienna (1934) - Carl (uncredited)
 The Private Life of Don Juan (1934) - Minor Role (uncredited)
 My Old Dutch (1934) - Cousin Arry
 The Scarlet Pimpernel (1934) - An Aristocrat (uncredited)
 It Happened in Paris (1935) - Albert (uncredited)
 Old Roses (1935) - Minor Role (uncredited)
 Late Extra (1935) - Fred (uncredited)
 Music Hath Charms (1935) - Minor Role (uncredited)
 It's a Bet (1935) - Arthur - Citizen of Doveton (uncredited)
 Blue Smoke (1935) - Ted
 Gaol Break (1936)
 Find the Lady (1936) - (uncredited)
 Highland Fling (1936) - Lizards
 To Catch a Thief (1936) - (uncredited)
 Rembrandt (1936) - Minor Role (uncredited)
 Sensation (1936) - Quirk
 You Must Get Married (1937) - Minor Role (uncredited)
 Take a Chance (1937) - Minor Role (uncredited)
 The Compulsory Wife (1937) - Minor Role (uncredited)
 Strange Adventures of Mr. Smith (1937) - Rodney Broadbent
 Farewell Again (1937) - Cpl. Edrich
 Cotton Queen (1937) - Telephone Operator (uncredited)
 First Night (1937) - Minor Role (uncredited)
 The Squeaker (1937) - Alfie (uncredited)
 There Was a Young Man (1937) - Minor Role (uncredited)
 Dinner at the Ritz (1937) - Minor Role (uncredited)
 The Last Adventurers (1937) - Joe Hanson
 Young and Innocent (1937) - Manager of Tom's Hat Cafe (uncredited)
 The Green Cockatoo (1937) - Lightning (uncredited)
 The Terror (1938) - (uncredited)
 You're the Doctor (1938) - (uncredited)
 His Lordship Goes to Press (1938)
 They Drive by Night (1938) - Minor Role (uncredited)
 The Villiers Diamond (1938) - Joe
 Second Thoughts (1938) - Minor Role (uncredited)
 Over the Moon (1939) - Minor Role (uncredited)
 The Face at the Window (1939) - Pierre, Babette's Beau
 Let George Do It! (1940) - Untipped Steward (uncredited)
 Crook's Tour (1940) - Bit Role (uncredited)
 Three Silent Men (1940) - Bystander at Accident (uncredited)
 Garrison Follies (1940) - Minor Role (uncredited)
 Spare a Copper (1940) - Minor Role (uncredited)
 Old Bill and Son (1941) - Pub Customer (uncredited)
 Inspector Hornleigh Goes To It (1941) - Hotel Porter
 Turned Out Nice Again (1941) - (uncredited)
 Champagne Charlie (1944) - Mogador Stage Manager
 Fiddlers Three (1944) - Minor Role (uncredited)
 For You Alone (1945) - Captain (uncredited)
 Perfect Strangers (1945) - Webster
 Wanted for Murder (1946) - Det. Ellis
 Captain Boycott (1947) - Press Photographer (uncredited)
 Vice Versa (1948) - Lord Gosport
 The Red Shoes (1948) - Her Mate
 The Winslow Boy (1948) - Fred (uncredited)
 The Small Voice (1948) - Maitland
 Another Shore (1948) - Bats Vere-Brown
 Passport to Pimlico (1949) - Captain Willow
 Private Angelo (1949) - Col. Michael
 Under Capricorn (1949) - Mr. Banks
 The Chiltern Hundreds (1949) - Reporter
 The Woman with No Name (1950) - Major
 Something in the City (1950) - Reporter
 Old Mother Riley's Jungle Treasure (1950) - F / O Prang
 Talk of a Million (1951) - church groundsman - (uncredited)
 Scarlet Thread (1951) - Basil (uncredited)
 The Woman's Angle (1952) - (uncredited)
 Girdle of Gold (1952) - Juror
 Never Look Back (1952) - Willie
 No Haunt for a Gentleman (1952) - Minor Role (uncredited)
 Mother Riley Meets the Vampire (1952) - Mugsy's Assistant
 Love's a Luxury (1952) - Clarence Mole
 Hot Ice (1952)
 There Was a Young Lady (1953) - Charlie, Duke of Chiddingford
 Melba (1953) - Minor Role (uncredited)
 Innocents in Paris (1953) - Customs Officer (uncredited)
 The Clue of the Missing Ape (1953) - Henchman in Opening Sequence (uncredited)
 Devil on Horseback (1954) - Steward (at horseracing track)
 Knave of Hearts (1954) - Pub Barman (uncredited)
 Father Brown (1954) - Minor Role (uncredited)
 Knave of Hearts (1954) - Saxby
 Duel in the Jungle (1954) - Bill Shine (uncredited)
 Raising a Riot (1955) - Dotty (uncredited)
 As Long as They're Happy (1955) - P.C. Bowker (uncredited)
 Where There's a Will (1955) - Porter
 John and Julie (1955) - Car Driver
 The Deep Blue Sea (1955) - Golfer
 The Gold Express (1955) - (uncredited)
 The Adventures of Quentin Durward (1955) - Trois-Eschelles
 Richard III (1955) - Beadle
 An Alligator Named Daisy (1955) - Minor Role (uncredited)
 Not So Dusty (1956) - Alistair
 Women Without Men (1956) - Reveller
 Bond of Fear (1956) - Man Hiker
 Blonde Bait (1956) - Lindbergh (uncredited)
 The Last Man to Hang (1956) - The Jury: Underhay
 Around the World in 80 Days (1956) - Minor Role (uncredited)
 The Tommy Steele Story (1957) - Minor Role (uncredited)
 High Flight (1957) - Policeman
 The House in the Woods (1957) - Colonel Shellaby
 Blue Murder at St. Trinian's (1957) - Policeman (uncredited)
 The Diplomatic Corpse (1958) - Humphrey Garrad
 The Man Inside (1958) - English Husband
 Blow Your Own Trumpet (1958) - Drummer (uncredited)
 Make Mine a Million (1959) - Outside Broadcast Producer (uncredited)
 Idol on Parade (1959) - Ticket Collector
 Jack the Ripper (1959) - Lord Tom Sopwith
 Left Right and Centre (1959) - Centre - Basingstoke
 The Boy and the Bridge (1959) - Bridge Mechanic
 Libel (1959) - The Guide
 Trouble with Eve (1960) - Alonzo, Artist
 The Challenge (1960) - Farm Labourer
 Not a Hope in Hell (1960) - Pettigrew
 The Pure Hell of St Trinian's (1960) - Usher
 Double Bunk (1961) - 2nd Thames Conservancy Officer
 The Rescue Squad (1963)
 The Yellow Rolls-Royce (1964) - Minor Role (uncredited)
 Joey Boy (1965) - Ticket Collector (uncredited)
 The Great St. Trinian's Train Robbery (1966) - Minor Role (uncredited)
 Bindle (One of Them Days) (1966) - Man in country pub
 The Sky Bike (1967) - Wingco
 Not Tonight, Darling (1971) - Captain Harrison
 Burke & Hare (1971) - Landlord
 The Jigsaw Man (1983) - Commissionaire

References

External links
 
 Bill Shine Obituary in The Independent

1911 births
1997 deaths
English male stage actors
English male film actors
English male television actors
Male actors from London
20th-century English male actors